Lunaria annua, called honesty or annual honesty in English, is a species of flowering plant in the cabbage and mustard family Brassicaceae. It is native to the Balkans and south west Asia, and cultivated throughout the temperate world.

Description
The leaves are hairy, the lower ones long-stalked, the upper ones stalkless. In spring and summer it bears terminal racemes of white or violet flowers, followed by showy, green through light brown, translucent, disc-shaped silicles (not true botanical seedpods). When a silicle is ripe and dry, a valve on each of its sides readily falls off, and its seeds fall off a central membrane which has a silvery sheen,  in diameter; the membrane can persist on a plant throughout a winter depending on the weather. These silicles are much used in dry floral arrangements.

Etymology
The Latin name lunaria means "moon-shaped" and refers to the shape and appearance of this species' silicles. The common name "honesty" arose in the 16th century, and may also relate to the translucence of its silicle membranes. In South East Asia, it is called the "money plant"  and in the United States it is commonly known as "silver dollars", "Chinese money", or "Chinese coins" because its silicle membranes have the appearance of silvery coins. For the same reason, in French it is known as monnaie du pape ("Pope's money").  In Denmark it is known as judaspenge and in Dutch-speaking countries as judaspenning (both meaning "coins of Judas"), an allusion to the story of Judas Iscariot and the thirty pieces of silver he was paid for betraying Christ.

Symbolism
In the language of flowers, the plant represents honesty, money, and sincerity. In witchcraft, the honesty plant is considered protective, being thought to keep away monsters. The plant is also used in spells for prosperity, the flat pods (when ripe and silvery) resembling coins and therefore being seen as symbolising promises of wealth. In the earliest surviving recipe for a flying ointment (recorded by Bavarian physician Johannes Hartlieb circa 1440), Lunaria is included as the herbal ingredient corresponding astrologically to the moon and therefore to be picked on the lunar day of Monday.

Cultivation
This plant is easy to grow from seed and tends to naturalize. It is usually grown as a biennial, being sown one year to flower the next. It is suitable for cultivation in a shady or dappled area, or in a wildflower garden, and the flowers and dried silicles are often seen in flower arrangements. Numerous varieties and cultivars are available, of which the white-flowered L. annua var. albiflora and the variegated white L. alba var. albiflora 'Alba Variegata' have won the Royal Horticultural Society's Award of Garden Merit.

Gallery

See also

 Dame's violet, Hesperis matronalis, a similar and related plant, but with long cylindrical seedpods instead of flat papery disks
 Lunaria rediviva, perennial honesty
 Pilea peperomioides, another plant known colloquially as the Chinese money plant

References

External links

 Jepson Manual Treatment
 USDA Plants Profile
 Photo gallery

Annual plants
Biennial plants
Brassicaceae
Garden plants
Plants described in 1753
Taxa named by Carl Linnaeus